Banov is a Slavic masculine surname, its feminine counterpart is Banova. Notable people with the surname include:

 Andriana Bânova (born 1987), Bulgarian triple jumper
 Ivan Banov (1916–1982), Soviet partisan leader

Bulgarian-language surnames